XOrbit, Inc., a privately held organization, claims to strive toward improving the quality of closed caption technologies for the hearing impaired, a U.S. Federal Communications Commission (FCC) requirement for broadcasters.

XOrbit develops and promotes products that purportedly eases the improvement and quality of closed captioning services for broadcast and cable television channels at a lower cost than traditional techniques.  For example, they provide a product that prevents broadcasters from having to re-encode line21 captioning information into media whenever a change to the captioning is made.  They also provide a product that allows stenographers to send captioning for a live event without requiring a satellite feed for the audio/video content (using TCP/IP technologies).

In 2003, Turner Entertainment gained a Technology & Engineering Emmy Award for XOrbit's closed caption server technology.
In 2009, XOrbit was awarded a National Academy of Television Arts and Sciences Technology & Engineering Emmy Award for Real-Time Delivery Confirmation Systems, a service to ensure that content (such as television commercials contracted by a network, or regular network programming) reaches the end viewer as transmitted.
In 2015, XOrbit earned another Technology & Engineering Emmy Award for its low latency video captioning encoder.

External links
 Official Website of XOrbit, Inc.
 FCC Report and Order for Closed Captioning

References

Companies established in 1996
Privately held companies based in Maryland
Companies based in Columbia, Maryland